The merger of four major firms into the German Steel Trust (Vereinigte Stahlwerke) in 1926 was modeled on the U.S. Steel corporation in the U.S. The goal was to move beyond the limitations of the old cartel system by incorporating advances simultaneously inside a single corporation. The new company emphasized rationalization of management structures and modernization of the technology; it employed a multi-divisional structure and used return on investment as its measure of success. it represented the "Americanization" of the German steel industry because of its internal structure, management methods, use of technology, and  emphasis  on mass production replicated  the Steel Trust developed a multi-divisional structure and aimed at return on investment as a measure of success.  The  chief  difference was that consumer capitalism as an industrial strategy did not seem plausible to German steel industrialists.

USA links
Fritz Thyssen and Friedrich Flick are co-owners in GST (German Steel Trust or Vereinigte Stahlwerke AG), an arrangement made by Wall Street financier as Clarence Douglas Dillon through Dillon Read & Co. Thyssen and Flick both financed Hitler rise's in power. GST is connected to UBC (Union Banking Corporation) through Harriman Fifteen Corporation holding one-third of Consolidated Silesian Steel Corporation while Flick got two-thirds.

WWII war machine
As IG Farben, GST was the heart of Nazi war machine, like Congress investigation showed.

Membership
 Fritz Thyssen
 Friedrich Flick
 Albert Voegler
 Otto Steinbrinck

See also
 Union Banking Corporation

Notes

Steel companies of Germany